The 1996–97 season was AS Monaco FC's 73rd season in existence and the club's 20th consecutive season in the top flight of French football. In addition to the domestic league, Monaco participated in this season's editions of the Coupe de France and the Coupe de la Ligue. The season covers the period from 1 July 1996 to 30 June 1997.

Competitions

Overview

French Division 1

League table

Results summary

Results by round

Matches

Source:

Coupe de France

Coupe de la Ligue

UEFA Cup

References

AS Monaco FC seasons
Monaco
French football championship-winning seasons
AS Monaco
AS Monaco